Soulicious may refer to:

Soulicious (Cliff Richard album)
Soulicious (Sarah Connor album)